Ioannes Kegen was a Pecheneg military commander who served under khan Tyrach in 1048, whose quarrel led to the Pecheneg revolt of 1048-1053.  Kegen and his followers took refuge in Paristrion and appealed to Byzantine emperor Constantine IX Monomachos for help.  He appeal was warmly accepted, resulting in his being named patrician, converting to Christianity and his tribe recognized as foederati.  Kegen’s was to protect a sector of the empire from invasion, but continued to harass Tyrach.  Tyrach responded by a massive invasion of Byzantium, but, once defeated, was allowed keep his army to aid in defending the empire against Seljuk incursions.  Tyrach instead turned to rebellion and was arrested.  Kegen was sent to replace him, but upon rumors of insurrection, he was also arrested.  The emperor again turned to Tyrach to lead the Pecheneg, but instead rebelled and was defeated at a decisive battle at Adrianople in 1050. Kegen was sent by the emperor as an emissary to the Pecheneg, but was killed as a traitor.

References

 Kaldellis, Anthony, Streams of Gold, Rivers of Blood: The Rise and Fall of Byzantium, 955 A.D. to the First Crusade. (Onassis Series in Hellenic Culture), Oxford University Press, Oxford, 2017, pp. 193, 199-200
 

Pechenegs
1050 deaths